Vladimir Sergeyevich Marukhin (born 6 July 2003) is a Russian football player. He plays for FC Volga Ulyanovsk on loan from FC Akron Tolyatti.

Club career
He made his debut in the Russian Football National League for FC Akron Tolyatti on 25 July 2021 in a game against FC Metallurg Lipetsk.

References

External links
 
 
 Profile by Russian Football National League

2003 births
Living people
Russian footballers
Association football midfielders
FC Lokomotiv Moscow players
FC Akron Tolyatti players
FC Volga Ulyanovsk players
Russian First League players